Kattevaram is an area of the Tenali in Guntur district of the Indian state of Andhra Pradesh. It is located in Tenali mandal of Tenali revenue division. It forms a part of Andhra Pradesh Capital Region.

Geography 

Demographics 

 census, Katevaram had a population of 13,209. The total population constitute, 6,608 males and 6,601 females —a sex ratio of 999 females per 1000 males. 1,384 children are in the age group of 0–6 years, of which 731 are boys and 653 are girls. The average literacy rate stands at 71.52% with 8,457 literates, significantly higher than the state average of 67.41%.

Government and politics 

Kattevaram gram panchayat is the local self-government of the village. There are 14 wards, each represented by an elected ward member. The present sarpanch is vacant, elected by the ward members. The village is administered by the  Tenali Mandal Parishad at the intermediate level of panchayat raj institutions.

Education 

Katevaram Zilla Parishad High School is a Zilla Parishad funded school, which provides secondary education in the village.

See also 
List of villages in Guntur district

References 

Villages in Guntur district